Longibucca is a genus of nematodes belonging to the family Diplogastridae.

The species of this genus are found in Northern America.

Species:

Longibucca catesbeianae 
Longibucca lasiura 
Longibucca vivipara

References

Nematodes